Simon Delaney (born 2 September 1970) is an Irish actor, director and television presenter. He is known for appearances in a range of films and television series such as RTÉ's comedy-drama Bachelors Walk and CBS' legal drama The Good Wife, and in the films Zonad (2009), Delivery Man (2013) and The Conjuring 2 (2016)

Personal life
Delaney was born in his family home in Raheny, Dublin. His father was a printer, who worked for Smurfit's and was also part of show-bands in the 1960s, where he played the clarinet and the saxophone. Delaney married Lisa Muddiman in 2005. The couple have 4 children, Cameron, Elliot, Isaac and they welcomed their 4th child, Lewis, in June 2016.

Career
Delaney's early work includes being a "Ballydung Player" (one of the actors on A Scare at Bedtime). His first high-profile role was for the RTÉ television series Bachelors Walk as one of three bachelors living together in a flat on the quays in Dublin, which ran from 2001 until 2003 to positive reviews as well as a Christmas special in 2006.

He appeared as Grogan in On the Nose in 2001 along with Dan Aykroyd and Robbie Coltrane. Delaney then starred as the title character in the film Zonad by director John Carney. He gained increased prominence due to a high-profile part in the Tesco Mobile Ireland TV advertising campaign. From 2009 to 2013, Delaney played Bill O'Brien in the cartoon mockumentary Roy, the BAFTA-winning, Irish television series about a cartoon boy.

Delaney appeared in the Irish version of genealogy TV series Who Do You Think You Are?, which was broadcast on RTÉ One on 19 October 2009. In October 2011, Delaney played an Anglo-Hiberno Lawyer in CBS's The Good Wife. In January 2012, he appeared in the series Touch. In September 2012, he appeared in the comedy series Moone Boy on Sky 1.

He played, Victor, the brother of the lead Vince Vaughn, in the 2013 film Delivery Man. In 2014, he played the role of Tom Crews in Mrs. Brown's Boys D'Movie. He has also made appearances in the fourth and fifth series of Sky 1 sitcom Trollied, playing the role of Brendan O'Connor. He also toured with Mrs. Brown's Boys in July 2015, with their live show How Now Mrs Brown Cow. He played the role of Dermot whilst Paddy Houlihan was on paternity leave.

Delaney was a judge on the RTÉ reality show Fame: The Musical. In February 2011, Delaney hosted the 8th Irish Film and Television Awards. He also hosted the 9th Irish Film and Television Awards in February 2012.

Since 2015, he has co-hosted Saturday AM and Sunday AM, now known as Weekend AM on TV3 (Virgin Media One), alongside Anna Daly.

Filmography

References

External links
 

1970 births
People from Raheny
Irish male stage actors
Irish male television actors
Irish television presenters
Irish male film actors
Irish television directors
Living people